Nathan Taylor (born January 31, 1983) is a Canadian former athlete who competed as a sprinter.

A native of Courtenay, British Columbia, Taylor was a junior "A" ice hockey winger for the Powell River Kings in his youth and only took up sprinting as a means of keeping up his fitness during the summer.

Taylor, a Canadian junior champion in the 100 metres, secured a scholarship to the University of Michigan.

In 2001 he won the 100 metres at the Canada Games, setting a record time in the event of 10.38 seconds.

Taylor was a member of the bronze medal-winning 4 × 100 metres relay team at the 2006 Commonwealth Games in Melbourne. He ran the third leg of the final, which was won by Jamaica.

His younger brother Adam played professional ice hockey.

References

External links
Nathan Taylor at World Athletics

1983 births
Living people
Canadian male sprinters
People from Courtenay, British Columbia
Sportspeople from British Columbia
Michigan Wolverines men's track and field athletes
Commonwealth Games bronze medallists for Canada
Commonwealth Games medallists in athletics
Athletes (track and field) at the 2006 Commonwealth Games
Medallists at the 2006 Commonwealth Games
Powell River Kings players
Canadian ice hockey forwards